Leverstock Green is a  suburb in Hemel Hempstead, in the English county of Hertfordshire. It is located on the eastern edge of the town.

Leverstock Green has a school, Leverstock Green Church of England Primary School, cricket club, tennis club, football club (Leverstock Green FC), village hall, shops, pubs and Holy Trinity church. Despite its recent amalgamation with Hemel Hempstead, the old names remain in memory of historical times.

Leverstock Green is a "modern" parish, formed about 1849 from parts of the parishes of St Michael's (St Albans), Abbots Langley and Hemel Hempstead.

There is documentary and archaeological evidence that people lived and worked in the immediate area of Leverstock Green from the time of the Roman occupation onwards.  Recent research indicates that settlement along Westwick Row may well date back even further to the Iron Age and perhaps the Bronze Age. It seems quite likely that this settlement was a "suburb" of the major Iron Age settlement at Pre Wood just outside St. Albans.

Leverstock Green was and is still affected by the 2005 Buncefield oil depot explosion (the largest explosion in peacetime Europe), causing damage to houses and other buildings, such as broken windows, fallen chimneys and in some cases more serious structural damage, temporarily displacing a number of families.

Sport and leisure

Leverstock Green has a Non-League football club Leverstock Green F.C., which plays at Pancake Lane.

References
 The Leverstock Green Chronicle  A detailed history of one village in Hertfordshire, United Kingdom, by Barbara Chapman. Accessed November 2006

External links

 Leverstock Green Village Association
Leverstock Green Football Club
Leverstock Green Cricket Club

Villages in Hertfordshire
Areas of Hemel Hempstead